Lawrence Ronald Costello (July 2, 1931 – December 13, 2001) was an American professional basketball player and coach. He played for the  Philadelphia Warriors, the Syracuse Nationals / Philadelphia 76ers for the NBA and the Wilkes-Barre Barons. He served as head coach of the Milwaukee Bucks and the Chicago Bulls. 

A six-time All-Star, he was the National Basketball Association's last two-handed set shooter. As the inaugural coach of the Bucks, he led them to a championship in their third season of existence in 1971, the fastest run for an expansion team in NBA history. In ten seasons as a coach, he reached the postseason six times, while winning 37 of his 60 postseason games as coach for a winning percentage of 61.7%, ninth best in NBA history. In 2022, Costello was inducted into the Naismith Basketball Hall of Fame as a contributor.

Playing career
Costello attended at Niagara University after growing up in Minoa, New York (born to parents that were basketball players in high school) and attending East Syracuse-Minoa High School. He had excelled in basketball, baseball, and football but chose to attend Niagara for basketball.

He played three seasons at Niagara from 1951 to 1954, after spending his freshman year on the freshman team due to the NCAA rules of the time. He led the Purple Eagles to the National Invitational Tournament in 1953 and 1954 before graduating as the all-time leading scorer (1,275) in program history (he now ranks in the top thirty). He wore the jersey number of 24 until his senior season due to his efforts in a notable game in his junior year. Against Siena on February 21, 1953, Costello played all but twenty seconds of a six-overtime game that ran for 69 minutes, where he scored 21 points in an 88-81 win. To commemorate his efforts in the longest college basketball game at that time, his jersey number was switched to 69. His jersey number of 69 was retired by Niagara in 2001.

He was drafted by the Philadelphia Warriors in 1954, electing to choose it over study at the University of Buffalo and their dental school due to having more of a passion for basketball. After his rookie season, he served in the Korean War for a year before returning to play for the Warriors. 
 After the season, he was traded to the Syracuse Nationals for $5,000. He averaged over ten points a game in each of his first eight seasons with the team.

He retired in 1965 from the Philadelphia 76ers (the former Syracuse Nationals), but eventually came back for the 1966–67 NBA season after new head coach Alex Hannum told him he needed a veteran point guard. With 42 games into the season, Costello ripped his Achilles tendon on January 6, 1967 and was replaced by Wali Jones.  He did, however, come back to participate in the 1967 playoffs, where he earned a championship ring.  Costello ended his career for the second and final time in 1968.

During his NBA career, Costello was selected to six NBA All-Star Games (playing in five).  He led the league in free throw percentage in the 1962–63 and 1964–65 seasons.

Coaching career
Costello began his coaching career at East Syracuse-Minoa High School, his alma mater, where he served for the 1968 season. 

He took over as head coach of the expansion team Milwaukee Bucks in 1968 and coached them to a league-best 66–16 mark in 1970–71 including a then-NBA record 20-game win streak. The Bucks won the championship in the post-season with a 4–0 sweep of the Baltimore Bullets.  The Bucks won a league best 59 games during the 1973–74 regular season and returned to the NBA Finals, where they lost to the Boston Celtics in seven games.

After a 3–15 start in the 1976–77 season, Costello resigned on November 22, 1976. He was replaced by Don Nelson, who would be head coach of the Bucks for 11 seasons.

He coached the Chicago Bulls for 56 games in 1978–79 before returning to Milwaukee to coach the Milwaukee Does of the Women's Professional Basketball League for part of the 1979–80 season.

Costello's last coaching job was at Utica College in the 1980s. The school was making the transition from Division III to Division I as an independent. Costello coached one season in Division III. In his second year in Division I, the Pioneers were the seventh most improved team in the country based on their won-loss record. He retired in 1987, having won 65 games at Utica in six seasons.

He was best known as one of the first coaches to employ videotape to analyze his team and opponents.

Later life
Costello appeared on NBA Live videogame series, as member of the 1950s NBA Live Legend All-Stars Team.

Costello died on December 13, 2001 after battling cancer for more than a year.

Costello was featured in the book Basketball History in Syracuse, Hoops Roots by author Mark Allen Baker published by The History Press in 2010. The book is an introduction to professional basketball in Syracuse and includes teams like (Vic Hanson's) All-Americans, the Syracuse Reds and the Syracuse Nationals (1946–1963).

NBA career statistics

Regular season

Playoffs

Head coaching record

|-
| align="left" |Milwaukee
| align="left" |
|82||27||55|||| align="center" |7th in Eastern||—||—||—||—
| align="center" |Missed Playoffs
|-
| align="left" |Milwaukee
| align="left" |
|82||56||26|||| align="center" |2nd in Eastern||10||5||5||
| align="center" |Lost in Conference Semifinals
|- ! style="background:#FDE910;"
| align="left" |Milwaukee
| align="left" |
|82||66||16||.|| align="center" |2nd in Midwest||14||12||2||
| align="center" |Won NBA Championship
|-
| align="left" |Milwaukee
| align="left" |
|82||63||19|||| align="center" |1st in Midwest||7||6||5||
| align="center" |Lost in Conference Finals
|-
| align="left" |Milwaukee
| align="left" |
|82||60||22|||| align="center" |1st in Midwest||6||2||4||
| align="center" |Lost in Conference Semifinals
|-
| align="left" |Milwaukee
| align="left" |
|82||59||23|||| align="center" |1st in Midwest||16||11||5||
| align="center" |Lost in NBA Finals
|-
| align="left" |Milwaukee
| align="left" |
|82||38||44|||| align="center" |4th in Midwest||—||—||—||—
| align="center" |Missed Playoffs
|-
| align="left" |Milwaukee
| align="left" |
|82||38||44|||| align="center" |1st in Midwest||3||1||2||
| align="center" |Lost in First Round
|-
| align="left" |Milwaukee
| align="left" |
|18||3||15|||| align="center" |(resigned)||-||-||-||
| align="center" |－
|-
| align="left" |Chicago
| align="left" |
|56||20||36|||| align="center" |(fired)||-||-||-||
| align="center" |－
|-class="sortbottom"
| align="left" |Career
| ||730||430||300|||| ||60||37||23||

References

External links
 Player stats @ basketball-reference.com
 Coaching stats @ basketball-reference.com

1931 births
2001 deaths
American men's basketball players
Basketball coaches from New York (state)
Basketball players from Syracuse, New York
Chicago Bulls head coaches
College men's basketball head coaches in the United States
Eastern Basketball Association coaches
High school basketball coaches in New York (state)
Milwaukee Bucks expansion draft picks
Milwaukee Bucks head coaches
National Basketball Association All-Stars
National Basketball Association championship-winning head coaches
Niagara Purple Eagles men's basketball players
People from Onondaga County, New York
Philadelphia 76ers players
Philadelphia Warriors draft picks
Philadelphia Warriors players
Point guards
Syracuse Nationals players
Utica Pioneers men's basketball coaches
Women's Professional Basketball League coaches